This is a list of rugby league footballers who have played first grade for the Gold Coast Chargers. Players are listed in the order they made their debut.

Players

References

External links
Rugby League Tables / Gold Coast Chargers Point Scorers
RLP List of Players

Lists of Australian rugby league players
National Rugby League lists
Gold Coast, Queensland-related lists